Kanlıdağ is a village in the Azdavay District of Kastamonu Province in Turkey. Its population is 86 (2021).

References

Villages in Azdavay District